The Golden State is the first studio album by Mia Doi Todd, released September 3, 2002 by Columbia Records. It's made up of songs culled from her previous acoustic albums and was produced in cooperation with Mitchell Froom and Yves Beauvais. It was recorded at the Sunset Sound Factory.

Track listing

References

2002 albums
Mia Doi Todd albums
Columbia Records albums
Albums produced by Mitchell Froom